Broken Valentine is a Korean alternative rock band notable for their 2011 appearance on the Korean television program Top Band.

Members
 Sunghwan — Bass
 Byun G — Lead guitar
 Koopa — Drums

Past
 Van — Lead vocals
 Ansu — Lead guitar

History
Broken Valentine was formed in 2002 under the name "6. August", but renamed themselves "B. August" in 2004 before finally settling on "Broken Valentine" in 2007.

Band membership fluctuated throughout the years as members have gone off for mandatory military service, however by 2007, the current five member lineup was solidified.

In December 2008, the reunited band participated in the "Asian Beat" band competition (Korean round) sponsored by YAMAHA, and became the finalist to represent Korea in the following year's Asian Beat Grand Finale held in Hong Kong. In February 2009, Broken Valentine won the Grand Prize and the Best Composer Award (Byun G) with the song "Answer me", which became their most popular track. Broken Valentine thus became the first team in Asian Beat's history to ever win two awards in the same year.

In 2009, Broken Valentine released their first EP album, the self-produced Calling You.   To celebrate this release, the performed a showcase concert, and continued to perform at local gigs and in support of other bands throughout South Korea. However, due to the nature of the South Korean music scene, with limited outlets for independent bands, they found difficulty achieving nationwide recognition, so in 2011, they tried out for the television program Top Band broadcast by the Korean Broadcasting System, a Survivor-like reality show wherein bands compete against each other.  Broken Valentine was considered an early favorite, and made it to the round of 16 on the show, but was eliminated at this round by the band "Toxic."

Following their elimination, Broken Valentine held their fourth exclusive concert "Royal Straight Flush" on October 14, 2011 to a crowd of more than 500 people.  In 2012, they released their first full album, Shade, before going on an indefinite hiatus.

In 2013, Broken Valentine released second full-length album, 'Aluminum.'  The album's title track 'Aluminum' was talked about by many music fans after the death of vocal member 'Van.'

On August 3, 2015, it was reported that Broken Valentine's vocal, Van (Kim Kyung Min), had died from drowning, after he went to play in the waters with his friends. Van's funeral procession was held on August 5, 2015.

Style
Broken Valentine writes and composes their own songs, mostly written by Byun G and Van. Their music style can be categorized as alternative rock and post-grunge.

Discography

Full-length album
 Shade (2012)
 Royal Straight Flush
 Shade (Title)
 M.K. Dance
 This Time
 Noname
 You Never Mind
 Down
 Dual-log
 L I F E
 What U Need
 Noname(Piano Ver.)

EP
Songs captured with "" is translated title.
 Alien (as B.August) (Digital Single, 2005)
 Alien
 "Just like that as is"
 Run
 Answer Me!! Is This What You NEED?? Self-produced EP (2007)
 What You NEED (Vocal Sunghwan ver.)
 L I F E (Vocal Sunghwan ver.)
 "If I open my eyes" (Vocal Sunghwan ver.)
 Answer Me (Vocal Sunghwan ver.)
 Alien (Vocal Van ver.)
 "Just like this as is" (Vocal Van ver.)
 Run (Vocal Van ver.)
 Calling You (2009)
 This time reprise
 "The sea in my old drawer" (cover of song by the band Panic)
 M.K. Dance
 "Song of the fossil"
 Answer me
 Down (2011)
 Down
 Noname
 RIDE  (Digital Single, 2013)
 Ride

Awards
 August 2006, received 2nd Prize at Music Contest for National University Students sponsored by Suwon City
 November 2008, won Grand Prize at YAMAHA Asian Beat Korea Final
 February 28, 2009, won Grand Prize and Best Composer Award at YAMAHA Asianbeat Grand Final (in Hong Kong)

References

South Korean rock music groups